Rozhdestveno is a rural locality (a village) and the administrative center of Rozhdestvenskoye Rural Settlement, Sobinsky District, Vladimir Oblast, Russia. The population was 700 as of 2010. There are 13 streets.

Geography 
Rozhdestveno is located 30 km north of Sobinka (the district's administrative centre) by road. Ratmirovo is the nearest rural locality.

References 

Rural localities in Sobinsky District
Vladimirsky Uyezd